Bhuragaon ( is the name of a town in the Indian state of Assam. Bhuragaon is located in Bhuragaon Tehsil of Morigaon district. Bhuragaon is situated on the south bank of the Brahmaputra.

Etymology
The name, Bhuragaon derived from Assamese word Bhur (ভূৰ) , which means a flat floating structure made of banana tree, bamboo, wood. And the word Gaon means village. The native peoples, use this bhur as a medium of transport. Later, this place came to known as Bhuragaon.

The name likely refers to the town's location on the fertile land near the Brahmaputra River, which has been an important source of livelihood for the people of Bhuragaon for centuries.

Geography
Bhuragaon is on the border of the Morigaon and Sonitpur District. Sonitpur District Dhekiajuli is north of there. It is also on the Border of another district, Nagaon.

Bhuragaon is a very beautiful village situated on the bank of the river Brahmaputra and surrounded by lush green forests and hills. The town covers an area of approximately 10 square kilometers and has an average elevation of 57 meters above sea level. The villages has a very rich history of religious harmony and educational prosperity.

History
This region was ruled independently by six rulers. During this time two princes from Darrang, Supradhvaj and Makardhvaj, fled from their homeland due to internal clash, by crossing the mighty Brahmaputra and they settled at Bahakajari. Later on, Supradhvaj married the daughter of Mangalsingh, the King of Baghara. Supradhvaj was then made the seventh king of the region, having an independent kingdom of his own.

During the days of Lachit Borphukan, another two princes from Darrang, Ram Singh and Bhimsingh crossed the Brahmaputra in search of plain lands. After Bhim Singh settled down, meanwhile, Ram Singh left for his home. Bhim Singh was not liked by the local people, hence, he left Brahmaputra and settled down near Mori Beel. This place came to known as Morigaon.

According to data mentioned in the dynasty of the Mayang kingdom, a prince named Ramjaya Singh came to pabhakati near present-day bhuragaon and established another Kachari kingdom during the reign of the 23rd king of this kingdom (1779-88 AD).

Some people from the state of pabhakati went and settled in the dhing-raidingia area. The new kingdom was known as the Garakhia kingdom.

Economy
In terms of economy, Bhuragaon is primarily an agricultural town. The fertile soil and favorable climate of the region make it suitable for the cultivation of crops like rice, jute, and tea. The town is also home to several small-scale industries, including handloom and handicrafts.

The Brahmaputra River, one of the largest rivers in the world, flows through Bhuragaon, providing a source of livelihood for the people of the town. The river is also an important transportation route for goods and people.

Administration

The administration of Bhuragaon is part of the larger administrative structure of the Morigaon district and the state of Assam.

The Morigaon district is administered by a Deputy Commissioner, who is the highest-ranking administrative officer in the district. The district is divided into several sub-divisions, each of which is headed by a Sub-Divisional Officer. Bhuragaon town falls under the jurisdiction of the Bhuragaon sub-division.

At the town level, Bhuragaon is governed by a local self-government body known as the Bhuragaon Town Committee. The Town Committee is responsible for providing basic civic amenities to the residents of the town, such as sanitation, street lighting, and water supply. The Town Committee is headed by a Chairperson and consists of elected members. There are 12 Gaon Panchayat located in Bhuragaon area.

These are mentioned below :

Demographics

Population
According to the 2011 Census information, the village hosts 1,06,140 people in more than thousand households.

Religion

Islam is the religion of the majority community at 60.26% (74,400) according the 2011 Census, followed by Hinduism at (48,849) 39.56%.

Language

According to the 2011 census, 73.02% of the population speaks Assamese, followed by 22.18% Bengali, 1.41% Hindi and 1.21% Bodo speakers. 2.18% of the population speak other languages like Tiwa, Nepali, etc.

Climate
Bhuragaon, like the rest of Assam, experiences a humid subtropical climate with high levels of rainfall throughout the year. The climate is characterized by hot summers, mild winters, and high humidity levels.

The summer season in Bhuragaon starts from March and lasts till June. During this period, the temperature ranges from 25°C to 35°C, with occasional heat waves that can push the temperature up to 40°C. The humidity levels are also high during this period, which can make the weather feel hotter and more uncomfortable.

The monsoon season in Bhuragaon starts in June and lasts till September. During this period, the town receives a significant amount of rainfall, which can sometimes lead to flooding and landslides. The average annual rainfall in Bhuragaon is around 1600 mm, with the highest amount of rainfall occurring in July and August.

The winter season in Bhuragaon starts in November and lasts till February. During this period, the temperature ranges from 10°C to 20°C, and the humidity levels are relatively low. The weather is generally pleasant during this period, making it a popular time for tourists to visit the town and explore its natural beauty.

Politics

Bhuragaon is represented in the Assam Legislative Assembly by the member of the legislative assembly (MLA) from the Laharighat (Assembly constituency), which includes Bhuragaon. The MLA is elected by the residents of the constituency every five years and is responsible for representing their interests in the state legislature.

Dr. Asif Mohammad Nazar was elected to the Assam Legislative Assembly from Laharighat in the 2021 Assam Legislative Assembly election as a member of the Indian National Congress.

Bhurgaon is part of Nowgong (Lok Sabha constituency).Pradyut Bordoloi is the current MP from Nowgong Parliament Constituency.

Members of Legislative Assembly

Education
Bhuragaon, like many other towns in India, places great importance on education as a means of promoting social and economic development. The town has a number of educational institutions that offer primary, secondary, and higher education to the residents of the town and the surrounding areas.

At the primary level, Bhuragaon has several government-run and private schools that offer education up to the fifth standard. These schools follow the curriculum prescribed by the Assam State Board of Education and provide basic education in subjects such as language, mathematics, science, and social studies.

At the secondary level, there are several government and private schools that offer education up to the tenth standard. These schools provide education in a wide range of subjects and prepare students for the Assam High School Leaving Certificate (HSLC) examination, which is a crucial milestone in the educational journey of students in Assam.

Bhuragaon is also home to a college that offer undergraduate courses in various disciplines, including arts, science, and commerce. These colleges are affiliated with the Gauhati University, which is one of the largest universities in the region.

Schools

Colleges

Culture
The culture of Bhuragaon is deeply rooted in the Assamese culture and traditions, which have been passed down through generations.

The people of Bhuragaon are predominantly engaged in agriculture, and the local cuisine is primarily influenced by the abundance of rice and fish in the region. Some of the popular dishes of Bhuragaon include masor tenga, a tangy fish curry, and pitha, a traditional Assamese dessert made from rice flour and coconut.

The local language of Bhuragaon is Assamese, but Hindi and English are also widely spoken. The town has several educational institutions, including schools and colleges, which have played a significant role in promoting education and literacy in the region.

Bihu

One of the most significant cultural events in Bhuragaon is the Bihu festival, which is celebrated three times a year - Bohag Bihu, Kati Bihu, and Magh Bihu. These festivals are celebrated with great enthusiasm and are marked by traditional dance forms such as the Bihu dance.

Baisagu 

Bwisagu is a very popular seasonal festival of the Bodo of Assam. Bwisagu means the start of the new year. Bwisagu is a Boro word which originated from the word "Bwisa" which means year or age, and "Agu" that means New Year.

Jonbeel Mela

Jonbeel Mela is a three-day annual indigenous Tiwa Community fair held the weekend of Magh Bihu at a historic place known as Dayang Belguri at Joonbeel. It is 3 km from Jagiroad in Morigaon district of Assam and 32 km from Guwahati. The National Highway connecting the mela is NH 37. The Joonbeel (Joon and Beel are Assamese terms for the Moon and a wetland respectively) is so-called because a large natural water body is shaped like a crescent moon.

Music

Assam, being the home to many ethnic groups and different cultures, is rich in folk music.  The indigenous folk music has in turn influenced the growth of a modern idiom, that finds expression in the music

Traditional crafts

Assam has maintained a rich tradition of various traditional crafts for more than two thousand years. Presently, Cane and bamboo craft, bell metal and brass craft, silk and cotton weaving, toy and mask making, pottery and terracotta work, wood craft, jewellery making, musical instruments making, etc. are remained as major traditions. Historically, Assam also excelled in making boats, traditional guns and gunpowder, colours and paints, articles of lac, traditional building materials, utilities from iron, etc.

Health
There is one primary healthcare center in Bhuragaon, which is operated by the government and provides basic medical care to the residents of the town. The healthcare center has a limited number of doctors, nurses, and other healthcare staff, and lacks adequate resources and equipment. As a result, many people in Bhuragaon have to travel to nearby cities like Nagaon or Guwahati to access better healthcare services.

Overall, while the healthcare infrastructure in Bhuragaon is limited, the government is taking steps to improve healthcare services and control the spread of communicable and non-communicable diseases. The town also has several non-governmental organizations (NGOs) and community-based organizations that work to improve healthcare access and awareness among the residents.

Transport

Road
National Highway 715A, is a spur road of National Highway 15.past.NH-715A traverses Assam. This highway links Jagiroad, Marigaon, Kaupati, Rowta, Udalguri, Khoirabari, and the Indo/Bhutan border (Samrang).

Proposed Bhuragaon-Kharupetia Bridge will be passing through the Bhuragaon Town.It will connect Kharupetia in Darrang district on the northern bank with Bhuragaon in Morigaon District on the southern bank.

The town is well connected by Bus routes especially with Guwahati, Upper Assam and lower Assam as well, 3-wheeler and 4 wheeler passenger carriers, rickshaws and tuk-tuks are also available.

Rail
Nearest Railway Station from Bhuragaon-Kharupetia Bridge was Mairabari Railway Station.The distance between Bhuragaon and Mairabari is 22 Km. There was an Passanger train, Guwahati - Mairabari Kolongpar Passenger (55603) from Mairabari Railway Station via Haibargaon-Chaparmukh Line.

Another important railway station from Bhuragaon is Jagiroad.Which was situated Approximately 42Km South-West of Bhuragaon.

The Guwahati-Lumding line of Indian Railway passes through Jagiroad Railway Station. Many intercity and passenger trains have stoppage in this station.

Air
Lokpriya Gopinath Bordoloi International Airport, also known as Gauhati International Airport (IATA: GAU), which falls under the city of Guwahati is the nearest airport from Bhuragaon.

Water

The waterways transportation services in Bhuragaon are used for transporting bulk goods and for movement of passenger. Ferry services are available for transportation of people from different ports along the Brahmaputra river to Badlichar, Darrang District.

Tourism

 Patekibori - The great poet saint of Assam, Srimanta Sankardeva , was born in the year 1449 at a small village called Alipukhuri-Patekibori near Bhuragaon in Marigaon district. The famous Patekibori Satra also situated in Patekibori

 Mayong - Mayong is a small village located near Bhuragaon and is known for its association with black magic and witchcraft. The village is home to several practitioners of traditional magic and is a popular destination for those interested in mysticism and the occult.

 Barshibandha - Bull fighting began in the Ahom era. But it was very extensive. This game is still played at Barshibandha, Morigaon. The first time is on Magh Bihu and the second time is on 26 January on the occasion of Democracy Day.

 Rajagadhuwa - There was an place called Rajagadhuwa near Bhuragaon Town. In local language, Raja means King and Dhuwa means wash, so the term Rajagadhuwa means a place where the king takes bath in past.

 Shivbari - An ancient temple of Hindu god Shiva has located in Shivari,near the Bhuragaon Bazar. On the month of july-august, a yearly mela held here.

 Sonduba - There are many sources of information about the historical Sondoba River in the Bhuragaon area of Morigaon district. In local assamese Language, xun or son means gold and duba means sink or immerse. Thus, the word Sonduba means a place, where gold has immersed. The Sondoba River flows from the Bardowa Shanti Jan and flows later from the confluence of Sonai and Lali. According to legend, the Sondoba River existed a hundred years before the birth of Mahapurusha Sankardeva. 
  There was an temple of lord Ganesha in Sonduba, Bhuragaon. Where, a banyan tree has a shape like the face of Ganesha.

Basnaghat - The name Basnaghat has been pronounced ‘Basonaghat’ by the local Bengali speaking peoples. However, the birth name of the place is Baxonaghat. It is said that, a Tiwa king had lust with his queen at this place. Therefore, the place is called Basnaghat.

Notable People
 Anil Raza - former general secretary, Assam Pradesh Congress Committee.

 Abdul Jalil - Former member of Assam legislative assembly (MLA) in 1985. He was an member of Congress (I).

 Haricharan Sarkar - Founder of Bhuragaon Haricharan Sarkar High School.

 Babul Bora - general secretary, Srimanta Sankaradeva Sangha.

 Dr Nazrul Islam - he was an Indian politician from the state of Assam. He was a member of the Assam Legislative Assembly from Indian National Congress. He was also minister in Tarun Gogoi Government of Assam since 7 June 2002 to 20 May 2016. He had been elected five straight times from the Laharighat constituency since 1996 to 2021.

 Rabbani Soyam - Rabbani soyam is a famous Model, YouTuber, Social Media Personality. He runs buddies production, a famous youtube channel.where one finds posts related to the trends, fashionable outfits, grooming accessories, latest style trends, product reviews and more. His social media accounts have a massive fan following and millions of followers. His last webseries was Niveer Aru Tora.

See also 

 Brahmaputra River
 Bhuragaon-Kharupetia Bridge
 Shankardev Shishu Vidya Niketan, Bhuragaon
 Laharighat Assembly Constituency
 Pobitora Wildlife Sanctuary
 Tiwa (Lalung)
 Tiwa language (India)
 Morigaon District

References

Cities and towns in Morigaon district